San Francisco de Asis de Yarusyacán District is one of thirteen districts of the province Pasco in Peru.

See also 
 Markapukyu
 Qaqapatan

References